Zameen Attur, also spelled Zamin Attur, Zamin Athur, or Zameen Athur), is a small village in Karur, Tamil Nadu, India near Esanatham. It is part of Karur District and surrounded by villages of Dindigul district. The village produces large quantities of drumstick, much of which is exported. Chettinad Cement Factory can also be found in the village. Agriculture is the most important source of work in the area.

Schools in Zameen Attur
(Panchayath union middle school)

Medical facilities in Zameen Attur

Banks in Zameen Attur

Nearest Towns and Cities
Dindigul -47 km
Karur    -36 km
Trichy   -94 km
Madurai  -111 km
Coimbatore -139 km

Places of worship

Villages in Karur district